Lingjing Hutong station is a station on Line 4 of the Beijing Subway, located on Xidan North St., about  north of the west entrance of Lingjing hutong, after which it is named.

Station Layout 
The station has an underground island platform.

Exits 
There are 3 exits, lettered B, C, and D. Exit C is accessible.

Gallery

References

External links
 

Railway stations in China opened in 2009
Beijing Subway stations in Xicheng District